The 2014 Adidas International Gimcheon was a professional tennis tournament played on hard courts. It was the first edition of the tournament which was part of the 2014 ATP Challenger Tour. It took place in Gimcheon, Korea between 5 and 11 May 2014.

Singles main-draw entrants

Seeds

 1 Rankings are as of April 28, 2014.

Other entrants
The following players received wildcards into the singles main draw:
  Chung Hong
  Chung Hyeon
  Kim Young-seok
  Lim Yong-kyu

The following players received special exempt into the singles main draw:
  Alex Bolt

The following players used protected ranking to gain entry into the singles main draw:
  John Millman

The following players received entry from the qualifying draw:
  Dimitar Kutrovsky
  Jason Jung
  Chen Ti
  Fritz Wolmarans

Doubles main-draw entrants

Seeds

1 Rankings as of April 28, 2014.

Other entrants 
The following pairs received wildcards into the singles main draw:
 Chung Hyeon /  Nam Ji-sung
 Lim Yong-kyu /  Noh Sang-woo
 Kim Huyn-joon /  Lee Dong-kyu

Champions

Singles

 Gilles Müller def.  Tatsuma Ito, 7–6(7–5), 5–7, 6–4

Doubles

 Samuel Groth /  Chris Guccione def.  Austin Krajicek /  John-Patrick Smith, 6–7(5–7), 7–5, [10–4]

External links

Adidas International Gimcheon
Gimcheon Open ATP Challenger
Adidas International Gimcheon
2014 in South Korean tennis